I&M Bank Rwanda Plc., is a commercial bank in Rwanda that is licensed by the National Bank of Rwanda. It is the second largest bank in Rwanda.

Location
The headquarters of the bank are located at KN 03 Avenue 9, in the central business district of Kigali, Rwanda's capital and largest city. The geographical location of the bank's headquarters are:01°56'55.0"S, 30°03'41.0"E (Latitude:-1.948611; Longitude:30.061389).

Overview
The Bank is the second-largest sized commercial bank in Rwanda, behind Bank of Kigali, serving large corporations, small-to-medium businesses, and individuals. As of December 2020, the bank's total assets were valued at RWF 417.2 billion (approx. US$424.46 million), with shareholders' equity of RWF 54.48 billion (approx. US$55.42 million).

History
The bank was opened in 1963 under the name (French "Banque Commerciale du Rwanda" (BCR)) or "Commercial Bank of Rwanda". In the beginning, it was wholly owned by the Government of Rwanda. In 2004, it was privatized. As of April 2010, Actis Capital owned 80 percent and the Rwandan government owned the remaining 20 percent of the financial institution. Actis Capital is a private equity investment firm, headquartered in London, United Kingdom, that specializes in investments in developing countries. The firm's investment portfolio was almost US$5 billion as of April 2010.

In July 2012, Actis Capital divested from BCR by selling its shares to a consortium comprising the I&M Bank Group from Kenya, PROPARCO from France, and the German Investment Corporation. The Rwandan government retained its shares in the bank. In August 2013, the bank rebranded to I&M Bank (Rwanda) to reflect its current shareholding.

In September 2015, I&M Bank Rwanda appointed its current Managing Director - Robin Bairstow.

In March 2017, I&M Bank Rwanda started trading on the Rwanda Stock Exchange through an Initial Public Offering.

I&M Bank Group
I&M Bank (Rwanda) is a member of the I&M Bank Group of companies. The group is a leading financial services provider in East Africa, with an asset base in excess of US$3.14 billion (KSh324.3 billion) as of September 2019. The group has operations in Kenya, Mauritius, Rwanda, and Tanzania.

Ownership
, the bank's stock was owned by the entities listed in the table below.

Branch network

I&M Bank Rwanda maintains the following branches, as of March 2020:

 Head Office - KN 03 Avenue 9, Nyarugenge, Kigali
 Kigali Heights - Kigali Heights Building, Gasabo, Kigali
 Remera Branch - Umuyenzi Plaza, Gasabo District, Kisimenti, Remera, Kigali
 Nyamirambo Branch - Merez 2 Petrol Station, Nyamirambo, Rwezamenyo Sector, Nyarugenge District, Kigali
 Nyabugogo Branch - Inkundamahoro Building, Nyabugogo Sector, Nyarugenge District, Kigali
 Kigali City Market Branch - Kigali City Market Building, Nyarugenge, Kigali 
 Chic Branch - CHIC Building, Downtown Nyarugenge, Kigali
 Musanze Branch - Muhoza Sector, Musanze, Northern Province, Rwanda 
 Gicumbi Branch - Byumba Sector, Byumba, Gicumbi District, Northern Province, Rwanda
 Rubavu Branch - Gisenyi Sector, Rubavu District, Western Province, Rwanda
 Rusizi Branch - Kamembe Sector, Rusizi District, Western Province, Rwanda 
 Karongi Branch - RSSB Building, Karongi, Western Province
 Huye Branch - Ngoma Sector, Huye, Southern Province
 Rwamagana Branch - Kigabiro Sector, Rwamagana, Eastern Province, Rwanda.

See also

 List of banks in Rwanda
 Economy of Rwanda

References

External links
  I&M Bank (Rwanda) Website
 I&M Bank Rwanda 2013 Half Year Profits Increase By 80%

Banks of Rwanda
Banks established in 1963
1963 establishments in Rwanda
Organisations based in Kigali
Economy of Kigali
I&M Bank Group